The 2002–03 Serie A season was the 69th season of the Serie A, the top level of ice hockey in Italy. Six teams participated in the league, and the HC Milan Vipers won the championship by defeating Asiago Hockey in the final.

Regular season

Playoffs

Semifinals 
 HC Milano Vipers - SHC Fassa 3:0 (5:3, 4:1, 5:1)
 Asiago Hockey - HC Bozen 3:2 (5:2, 3:4 SO, 4:1, 0:1, 4:3 SO)

Final 
 HC Milano Vipers - Asiago Hockey 4:2 (1:2, 3:2, 2:3 SO, 6:3, 4:1, 3:2 SO)

External links
 Season on hockeyarchives.info

Serie A (ice hockey) seasons
Italy
2002–03 in Italian ice hockey